Hector Copland Macpherson,  (1 April 1888 – 19 May 1956) was a Scottish astronomer and minister. His 1940 work Biographical Dictionary of Astronomy was later incorporated into the Biographical Encyclopedia of Astronomers, which was first published in 2007.

Life
Macpherson was born in Edinburgh on 1 April 1888, the son of author and journalist Hector Carsewell Macpherson and his wife, Mary Janet Copland. As a child, Macpherson had rheumatic fever. The illness was the reason he did not attend school. Instead, he was taught at home until he went to university. At age 13, he was given a telescope. Macpherson set up an observatory in the family garden with the gift. In 1911, he was elected a Fellow of the Royal Astronomical Society, proposed for fellowship by the Astronomer Royal Frank Watson Dyson.

In 1917 he was elected a Fellow of the Royal Society of Edinburgh. His proposers were James Young Simpson, Walter Biggar Blaikie, John George Bartholomew, and Cargill Gilston Knott.

Macpherson studied theology at New College, Edinburgh and became a minister for the United Free Church of Scotland. He served five years at a church in Louden, Ayrshire. In 1921, Macpherson returned to Edinburgh, and was named the minister of the Guthrie Memorial Church. He led the church during its 1929 merger with the Church of Scotland and served the congregation until his death. He earned a Ph.D from Edinburgh in 1923, for his research on the Covenanter movement. He served as president of the Astronomical Society of Edinburgh on three occasions: 1924; 1926 to 1928; and 1952 to 1954.

He died in Edinburgh 19 May 1956. He is buried with his wife and daughter in North Berwick Cemetery. The grave lies on the eastern wall towards the north-east.

Family
Macpherson married Catherine Anne Chisholm (1895-1976) in 1917, with whom he had four children: Hector, Fergus, Mari Margaret Anne, and Catherine Isabel.

Books

References

Citations

Sources

External links

 

1888 births
1956 deaths
Writers from Edinburgh
Scottish astronomers
20th-century Ministers of the Church of Scotland
Alumni of the University of Edinburgh
Fellows of the Royal Astronomical Society
Fellows of the Royal Society of Edinburgh
20th-century Ministers of the Free Church of Scotland
20th-century Scottish scientists
Presidents of the Astronomical Society of Edinburgh